Scum is a hardcore punk/black metal band formed in 2002 with members from Amen, Emperor, Zyklon, and Turbonegro. All members are Norwegian except for American vocalist Casey Chaos. According to the band, their idea is to play "black metal with a real punk rock attitude".

Their album, Gospels for the Sick, was recorded in one single session in 2004, and they have only had a few live performances, one being at the Norwegian festival (Øya Festivalen) in the summer of 2005, and another at Camden Underworld in London, which footage of is available on YouTube. The band had guest appearances from several artists, one of which was Mortiis who cowrote and performed on the yet unreleased song "Speaking in Tongues".

Associated acts
Scum's band members have played in several other bands. Guitarist Samoth played in many bands including notable black metal bands like Emperor, Gorgoroth, Satyricon, Zyklon, Thou Shalt Suffer, Arcturus and Zyklon-B, and did sessions for Ildjarn and Burzum. Drummer Faust contributed to the music of Emperor, Aborym, Zyklon, Thorns and several less notable bands like Impostor, Blood Tsunami, Death Fuck, Decomposed Cunt and Stigma Diabolicum. Cosmocrator played for Windir, Zyklon, Source of Tide and Mindgrinder. Vocalist Casey Chaos writes and records everything apart from drums for his band, Amen, and also provides vocals for Damned Damned Damned and Grindhaller XXX. Happy-Tom plays bass guitar for Turbonegro.

Discography
Gospels for the Sick (2005)

Members
Casey Chaos – vocals
Samoth (Tomas Thormodsæter Haugen) – guitar
Faust (Bård Eithun) – drums
Cosmocrator – guitar
Happy-Tom – bass

References

External links
Official webpage

Norwegian black metal musical groups
Norwegian hardcore punk groups
Musical groups established in 2004
2004 establishments in Norway

Musical groups from Norway with local place of origin missing